Angrignon Park is an urban park in the Le Sud-Ouest borough Montreal, Quebec, Canada. Angrignon Park has a total area of 97 hectares. It includes a 1.1km long lake. It is considered by the City of Montreal as one of its large parks.

The park is named for Jean-Baptiste Angrignon (1875–1948), an alderman in Côte Saint-Paul from 1921 to 1934. Before 1927, the area was named Crawford Park.

The park was inspired by the design of 19th-century English gardens. The park contains 20,000 trees, winding paths and a pond surrounded by cattails.

The park is located just south of Ville-Émard, east of Carrefour Angrignon, which is also named after Jean-Baptiste Angrignon, and west of Verdun.

The park was once home to a small farm.

Angrignon station – the western terminus of the Montreal metro Green Line – is at the northern corner of the park.

On December 7, 2020, the City of Montreal announced a plan to create a green corridor between the park and Bois-de-Saraguay Nature Park. The plans included a walking path, a bicycle link, and landscaping.

References

Tourist attractions in Montreal
Zoos in Quebec
Parks in Montreal
Le Sud-Ouest
Former zoos